Mesodiphlebia ochraceella is a species of snout moth. It was described by George Hampson in 1918 and is known from Argentina.

References

Moths described in 1918
Anerastiini